Tibby Creek is a stream in the U.S. state of Mississippi. It is a tributary to the Yockanookany River.

Tibby is a name derived from the Choctaw language purported to mean either (sources vary) "icy creek" or "to fight". A variant name is "Tilby Creek".

References

Rivers of Mississippi
Rivers of Attala County, Mississippi
Rivers of Choctaw County, Mississippi
Mississippi placenames of Native American origin